The Essen tramway network is a  network of tramways forming part of the public transport system in Essen, a city in the federal state of North Rhine-Westphalia, Germany. Parts of the system also serve the neighbouring city of Gelsenkirchen.

The network is complemented by the three light rail lines of the Essen Stadtbahn.

Lines 
, the  tram network consisted of the following seven lines:

Sections with shorter headways in Bold, sections with longer headways in italics.
1 During rush hour via Hollestraße to Steele, at shoulder times only to Hollestraße. and in off peak times Rathaus Essen to Essen Hbf.
2 Line is operated jointly by Ruhrbahn/BOGESTRA (almost exclusively with Ruhrbahn rolling stock).
3 Extra services during rush hour from Rathaus Essen to Hollestraße, other services from Rathaus via Hbf. to Bredeney.

See also
 Essen Stadtbahn
 Trams in Germany
 List of town tramway systems in Germany

References

Inline references

Bibliography

External links

 
 

Transport in Essen
Essen
Metre gauge railways in Germany
750 V DC railway electrification
Essen